Charles Racquet (1597–1664) was a French organist and composer, best known for his monumental organ Fantaisie.

He came from a large family of Parisian organists and himself was appointed organist of Notre Dame de Paris at an early age, in 1618. He held the post until shortly before his death and was succeeded by another member of the Racquet family. He also served as musician to Marie de' Medici (a post that his father Balthazar occupied earlier) and to Anne d'Autriche, the Queen Mother. Racquet was very highly regarded by his contemporaries: his pupils included the famous lutenist Denis Gaultier (who wrote a tombeau on his teacher's death), Jesuit scholar Marin Mersenne was a close friend of his. In the 18th century writer Jean-Benjamin La Borde named Racquet "the best organist of his time."

Of Racquet's music only a single organ Fantaisie and Douze versets de psaume en duo sur les douze modes (12 duos on psalm verses) survive, in Mersenne's Traité de l'harmonie universelle (1636). The fantasia, written upon Mersenne's request to "show what could be done at the organ", is one of the most famous pieces of the French organ school. It is inspired by Dutch music, particularly that of Sweelinck: a single theme is developed through several sections, most of them imitative. The layout is as follows:
 Section 1: traditional imitative counterpoint with several countersubjects
 Section 2: imitative counterpoint on an ornamented version of the subject, with faster counterpoints
 Section 3: subject in augmentation, stated once in each voice
 Section 4: a bicinium duplici contrapuncto, a two-voice section in which the subject in its original form is combined with sixteenth-note figures in the other voice
 Section 5: a toccata above a pedal point
Racquet's Fantaisie is a unique piece in the entire French keyboard repertory; nothing like it was ever written again in France.

Notes

References
Apel, Willi. 1972. The History of Keyboard Music to 1700. Translated by Hans Tischler. Indiana University Press. . Originally published as Geschichte der Orgel- und Klaviermusik bis 1700 by Bärenreiter-Verlag, Kassel.
Oleksiuk, Olga (ed.). 2019. Individual Spirituality in Post-Nonclassical Arts Education. Newcastle: Cambridge Scholars Publishing. .

External links
Listen to the Fantaisie by Racquet

Gallica: 12 Versets de psaume, pp. 284–289

French Baroque composers
French male classical composers
French classical organists
French male organists
1597 births
1664 deaths
Musicians from Paris
17th-century classical composers
17th-century male musicians
Male classical organists